Oolitic is a town in Indian Creek and Shawswick townships, Lawrence County, Indiana, United States. The population was 1,184 at the 2010 census.

History
Oolitic was platted on March 23, 1896, by the Bedford Quarries Company. It was incorporated in 1900. In 1910, its population was 1,079; in 1914 it had risen to about 2,000. Oolite is a type of limestone found in Indiana.

Oolitic is the site of a limestone statue of comic-strip boxer Joe Palooka, moved there from Bedford in 1984.

Oolitic is the opposing basketball team during the season opener in the film Hoosiers.

Geography
Oolitic is located at  (38.895513, -86.524696).

Climate
The climate in this area is characterized by hot, humid summers and generally mild to cool winters.  According to the Köppen Climate Classification system, Oolitic has a humid subtropical climate, abbreviated "Cfa" on climate maps.

Geology
The town is built upon oolitic limestone, which gives the town's name. The town was founded for the purpose of quarrying this material, for building purposes.

Oolitic was originally platted as "Limestone" on September 26, 1888. In 1896, the name was sent to Washington, D.C., to allow a post office to be established. The request was refused because of a town already named Limestone, Indiana. Doctor R. B. Short suggested using "Oolitic", and Oolitic became incorporated on November 4, 1901.
The word Oolitic was used as an adjective for Oolitic limestone (derived from the Greek word oolite, meaning eggs and stone). Limestone is a sedimentary rock composed of calcium carbonate, magnesium carbonate and quartz, along with the small shells and eggs left behind when this area was covered by an inland sea.
Found immediately north of Oolitic are some of the largest Limestone quarries in the world, many of them in continuous operation since the 1830s. Many famous buildings are built of Oolitic Limestone. Probably the most famous is the Empire State Building. Visitors can see the "Empire Hole," about 1/2 mile north of Oolitic

Demographics

2010 census
As of the census of 2010, there were 1,184 people, 534 households, and 334 families living in the town. The racial makeup of the town was 98.7% White, 0.3% African American, 0.3% Asian, 0.2% from other races, and 0.6% from two or more races. Hispanic or Latino of any race were 1.0% of the population.

There were 534 households, of which 29.2% had children under the age of 18 living with them, 45.3% were married couples living together, 11.4% had a female householder with no husband present, 5.8% had a male householder with no wife present, and 37.5% were non-families. 34.1% of all households were made up of individuals, and 14.4% had someone living alone who was 65 years of age or older. The average household size was 2.22 and the average family size was 2.80.

The median age in the town was 41 years. 22.1% of residents were under the age of 18; 9.3% were between the ages of 18 and 24; 23.7% were from 25 to 44; 28% were from 45 to 64; and 17.1% were 65 years of age or older. The gender makeup of the town was 50.3% male and 49.7% female.

2000 census
As of the census of 2000, there were 1,152 people, 507 households, and 337 families living in the town. The racial makeup of the town was 98.78% White, 0.17% Native American, 0.09% Asian, 0.09% from other races, and 0.87% from two or more races. Hispanic or Latino of any race were 0.35% of the population.

There were 507 households, out of which 29.0% had children under the age of 18 living with them, 50.1% were married couples living together, 12.6% had a female householder with no husband present, and 33.5% were non-families. 31.2% of all households were made up of individuals, and 11.2% had someone living alone who was 65 years of age or older. The average household size was 2.27 and the average family size was 2.82.

In the town, the population was spread out, with 22.7% under the age of 18, 9.9% from 18 to 24, 27.5% from 25 to 44, 25.4% from 45 to 64, and 14.5% who were 65 years of age or older. The median age was 39 years. For every 100 females, there were 88.2 males. For every 100 females age 18 and over, there were 90.8 males.

The median income for a household in the town was $31,250, and the median income for a family was $37,279. Males had a median income of $30,758 versus $21,650 for females. The per capita income for the town was $16,889. About 13.4% of families and 13.2% of the population were below the poverty line, including 17.9% of those under age 18 and 12.2% of those age 65 or over.

References

Bibliography

External links
 Oolitic Fire Department

Towns in Lawrence County, Indiana
Towns in Indiana
1896 establishments in Indiana
Populated places established in 1896